Reed: Insurgent Mexico is a 1973 Mexican drama film directed by Paul Leduc. It was selected as the Mexican entry for the Best Foreign Language Film at the 46th Academy Awards, but was not accepted as a nominee. The film is based on John Reed's book Insurgent Mexico, a collection of Reed's accounts of the Mexican Revolution.

Cast
 Claudio Obregón as John Reed
 Eduardo López Rojas as Gral. Tomás Urbina
 Ernesto Gómez Cruz as Pablo Seanez
 Juan Ángel Martínez as Julian Reyes
 Carlos Castañón as Fidencio Soto
 Víctor Fosado as Isidro Anaya
 Lynn Tillet as Isabel
 Hugo Velázquez as Longion Guereca
 Heraclio Zepeda as Pancho Villa
 Carlos Fernández del Real as Felipe Angeles
 Max Kerlow as Antonio Swafeyta

Awards

Ariel Awards
The Ariel Awards are awarded annually by the Mexican Academy of Film Arts and Sciences in Mexico. Reed: Mexico Insurgente received one award out of four nominations.

|-
|rowspan="4" scope="row"| 15th Ariel Awards
|scope="row"| Mecánica Nacional(tied with El Castillo de la Pureza and Mecánica Nacional)
|scope="row"| Best Picture
| 
|-
|scope="row"| Paul Leduc
|scope="row"| Best Direction
| 
|-
|scope="row"| Alexis Grivas
|rowspan="1" scope="row"| Best Cinematography
| 
|-
|scope="row"| Giovanni Korporaal, Rafael Castanedo
|rowspan="1" scope="row"| Best Editing
| 
|-

See also
 List of submissions to the 46th Academy Awards for Best Foreign Language Film
 List of Mexican submissions for the Academy Award for Best Foreign Language Film
Reds (1981 film, with Warren Beatty as John Reed)
Red Bells (1982 film, with Franco Nero as John Reed)

References

External links
 

1973 films
1973 drama films
1970s Spanish-language films
Mexican drama films
Films directed by Paul Leduc
Films about journalists
Films about Pancho Villa
Mexican Revolution films
1970s Mexican films